Stéphan Perrot (born 19 June 1977 in Nice) is a breaststroke swimmer from France, who won the gold medal in the men's 200 metres breaststroke event at the 1999 European Championships in Istanbul. He represented his native country at the 2000 Summer Olympics in Sydney, Australia, where he was eliminated in the semifinals of the men's 200 m breaststroke.

References

External links
 

1977 births
Living people
French male breaststroke swimmers
Olympic swimmers of France
Swimmers at the 1996 Summer Olympics
Swimmers at the 2000 Summer Olympics
European Aquatics Championships medalists in swimming
Mediterranean Games gold medalists for France
Swimmers at the 1997 Mediterranean Games
Mediterranean Games medalists in swimming